was a Bakumatsu period daimyō under the Edo period Tokugawa shogunate of Japan. He was the 7th daimyō of Itoigawa Domain in Echigo Province and later the 17th (and final) daimyō  of Fukui Domain in Echizen Province.

Biography
Mochiaki was the fourth son of Matsudaira Naoharu of Itoigawa. He was received in formal audience by Shōgun Tokugawa Ieyoshi in 1852. His childhood name was Yuanosuke (鑜之助). He underwent his genpuku ceremony in 1853, becoming Matsudaira Naokiyo (直廉). On the retirement of his father in 1857, he became  daimyō  of Itoigawa. At that time, his courtesy title was Hyūga-no-kami and his court rank  was Junior Fifth Rank, Upper Grade.

In 1858, Matsudaira Yoshinaga (better known as Matsudaira Shungaku) was forced into retirement during the Ansei Purge, and Naokiyo was transferred to Fukui Domain and was adopted as Yoshinaga's successor. His courtesy title became Echizen-no-kami, and also Sakon'e-no-chūjō, and his court rank was increased to Junior Fourth Rank, Upper Grade. Also, Shōgun Tokugawa Iemochi granted him a kanji from his name, which then became Matsudaira Mochiaki. Uni 1864, his court rank became Senior Fourth Rank, Lower Grade.

However, he was mostly a figurehead within Fukui Domain, as the retired Matsudaira Yoshinaga continued to exert much influence, and all of the powerful retainers of the domain, including Yuri Kimimasa, Yokoi Shōnan, etc. continued to be loyal to their former lord.

During the First Chōshū expedition, he served as deputy commander under the overall command of Tokugawa Yoshikatsu.

In June 1869, he defected to the side of the new Meiji government and was appointed imperial governor of Fukui, a post which he held to the abolition of the han system in 1871. In 1884, he became a Count (hakushaku) in the kazoku peerage system. He was awarded the Fourth class of the Order of the Rising Sun in 1885. In 1889, he inherited the title of Marquis (koshaku) from his adopted father.

He died in 1890. His son, Matsudaira Yasutaka (1867–1930) served as a member of the House of Peers of the Diet of Japan and was author of a number of works on agricultural science, having studied for several years in England.

Family
 Father: Matsudaira Naoharu (1810–1878)
 Wives:
Yuki-hime, daughter of Kuga Takemichi
 Ikuhime, daughter of Hirohashi Tanetatsu
 Children:
 Matsudaira Yasutaka 
 Matsudaira Nagayori
 Takeya Harumitsu
 Fujinami Shigeuji
 Kiyohime, married Nabeshima Naoyasu
 Keihime, married Kato Yasumichi
 Akihime, married Toda Yasukei

External links
 "Fukui" at Edo 300 
  越前松平氏 (Echizen Matsudaira) at ReichsArchiv.jp

Notes

Shinpan daimyo
Kazoku
1836 births
1890 deaths
Meiji Restoration
Fukui-Matsudaira clan
People of Edo-period Japan